Titovo is a rural locality (a selo) in Togulsky Selsoviet, Togulsky District, Altai Krai, Russia. The population was 129 as of 2013. There are 4 streets.

Geography 
Titovo is located 16 km southwest of Togul (the district's administrative centre) by road. Buranovo is the nearest rural locality.

References 

Rural localities in Togulsky District